Rowohlt Verlag is a German publishing house based in Hamburg, with offices in Reinbek and Berlin. It has been part of the Georg von Holtzbrinck Group since 1982. The company was created in 1908 in Leipzig by Ernst Rowohlt.

Divisions
 Kinder
 Rowohlt Berlin
 Rowohlt Taschenbuch
 Rowohlt Theater Verlag
 Rowohlt
 Wunderlich
 Rowohlt Hundert Augen
 Rowohlt e-book
 Rowohlt Polaris
 Rowohlt Rotfuchs
 Rowohlt Repertoire
 Rowohlt Rotation
 Rowohlt Medienagentur

Notable authors

 Paul Auster
 Simone de Beauvoir
 Wolfgang Borchert
 Albert Camus
 C. W. Ceram
 A. J. Cronin
 Jeffrey Eugenides
 Hans Fallada
 Jon Fosse
 Buddy Elias 
 Jonathan Franzen
 Max Goldt
 Ernest Hemingway
 Felicitas Hoppe
 Siri Hustvedt
 Heinrich Eduard Jacob
 Elfriede Jelinek
 Daniel Kehlmann
 Imre Kertész
 Georg Klein
 Henry Miller
 Toni Morrison
 Robert Musil
 Vladimir Nabokov
 Péter Nádas
 John Dos Passos
 Harold Pinter
 Oleg Postnov
 James Purdy
 Thomas Pynchon
 Uwe Reimer
 Philip Roth
 Peter Rühmkorf
 José Saramago
 Jean-Paul Sartre
 Kurt Tucholsky
 John Updike
 Ernst von Salomon
 Sylke Tempel

External links
 

Book publishing companies of Germany
Holtzbrinck Publishing Group
1908 establishments in Germany
Publishing companies established in 1908